Chester Town Hall may refer to:

in England
 Chester Town Hall, in Chester, Cheshire

in the United States
 Bear Valley Grange Hall, now the township hall for Chester Township, Wabasha County, Minnesota
 Chester Town Hall (Chesterville, Ohio) in Chester Township, Morrow County, Ohio

Architectural disambiguation pages